Transferoviar Grup (TFG)  is a private railway company in Romania, founded in 2003. Initially the company only operated freight trains but in 2010 it also started passenger services.

Besides freight hauling, it is the administrator of a few leased secondary lines, of which most are operated with passenger trains by its wholly owned subsidiary:

 Bucharest-Oltenița
 Buzău-Nehoiaşu
 Galați-Târgu Bujor-Bârlad
 Buda–Slănic
 Costești – Roșiori

Passenger transportation
Passenger trains are run by TFG's subsidiary Transferoviar Călători using mainly former DB Class VT 24, VT 614, ex-NS DH2 and Bombardier Talent class 1000 Diesel multiple units.

It also operates several trains on the Bucharest-Buzău, Buzău-Galați and Cluj-Napoca mainlines.

References

External links
 Transferoviar Grup
Transferoviar Călători

Railway companies of Romania
Passenger rail transport in Romania
Railway companies established in 2003